Jean François Louis de Brach (28 May 1668 – 24 September 1739) was a French naval officer who was governor of Martinique from 1728 to 1739.

Life

Jean François Louis de Brach was born on 28 May 1668.
His parents were François Louis de Brach, seigneur de la Mothe-Montussan (died 1701) and Marie de Lootins.
He joined the navy and was a garde-marine in 1685, enseigne de vaisseau in 1691 and lieutenant de vaisseau in 1692.

In 1717 Brach married Marie Thérèse Boutou de La Baugissière in Rochefort.
Their children were Jean (1718–93), François (born 1720), Renée Justine, Marie Anne Louise and Bertille.
In 1725 he bought Esnandes from Jean Gâtebois, director of the Compagnie des Indes.
His son, also Jean-François-Louis de Brach, was seigneur d’Esnandes at the time of the French Revolution.

Brach was promoted to capitaine de frégate in 1727 and was appointed governor of Martinique the same year.
He replaced Jacques Charles Bochart, sieur de Champigny, and was succeeded by André Martin, Sieur de Pointesable.
He was made commander of the Windward Islands in 1728, acting for the governor general.
Brach died on 24 September 1739 in Rochefort, Charente-Maritime.

Notes

Citations

Sources

1668 births
1739 deaths
French Governors of Martinique